Kasoda is a village in Erandol, Jalgaon district, Maharashtra. Kasoda is 48km from city Jalgaon and 322km from city Mumbai. Kasoda is second biggest village in Jalgaon district. As per census 2011, population of kasoda is about 35,000. The name Kasoda is derived from kushada which was related to name of a saint who spent most of his life in jungles. 

It is a renowned village in Erandol tehsil. Tuesday is bazaar day, when people from nearly 20 villages come to Kasoda. On the same day the cattle market is open. Vasant Sahakari sugar factory is here. Kasoda is place with currupted gram panchayat members. Tap-Water comes here after every 45 days.

Kasoda has people in a variety of castes and religions. The area is known for its richness in soil and acres of productive lands. Farmers cultivate bajra, soybean, jowar and variety of pulses. Kasoda is also famous for manufacturing the hand made 'Zore'.  

The nearest place from Kasoda is Chalisgaon.

One of the biggest festivals in this village is Harinaam Sapttah, which is celebrate by all the local peoples. During  the day, thousands of people comes together to celebrate 'Kakada aarti'. Sant Govind maharaj stayed here. Who renovate the 'padmalay' temple.

References 

Villages in Jalgaon district